Hwang In-sung (January 9, 1926, Muju, North Jeolla – October 11, 2010, Seoul) was a South Korean soldier and politician who served as the 25th Prime Minister.

Born in the 4th Military Academy, he was appointed as a Major General in 1968. After the May 16 military affairs, he worked as a politician. Later, he joined the Democratic Party, serving as a member of the 11th, 12th and 14th National Assembly and as the first Prime Minister of the Civilian Government in 1993. He then resigned as prime minister for 10 months due to an open rice ripple. In 1996, he served as a standing advisor to the Kumho Asiana Group. He served as a chairman of the Ahn Jung-geun association from 2002 until his death.

He died of old age on October 11, 2010 at the age of 84.

References

External links 

 Hwang In-sung

Prime Ministers of South Korea
1926 births
Government ministers of South Korea
Governors of North Jeolla Province
2010 deaths
South Korean generals
Members of the National Assembly (South Korea)
People from North Jeolla Province
Korea Military Academy alumni
Changwon Hwang clan